Lach Dennis is a civil parish in Cheshire West and Chester, England. It contains six buildings that are recorded in the National Heritage List for England as designated listed buildings, all of which are at Grade II. This grade is the lowest of the three gradings given to listed buildings and is applied to "buildings of national importance and special interest". Other than the village of Lach Dennis, the parish is entirely rural, the listed buildings all being domestic or related to agriculture. Five of the six buildings originated in the 17th century.

See also
Listed buildings in Allostock
Listed buildings in Byley
Listed buildings in Davenham
Listed buildings in Lostock Gralam
Listed buildings in Nether Peover
Listed buildings in Northwich
Listed buildings in Plumley
Listed buildings in Rudheath

References

Listed buildings in Cheshire West and Chester
Lists of listed buildings in Cheshire